Grafton Green (August 12, 1872 – January 27, 1947) was an American jurist who served on the Tennessee Supreme Court from 1910 to 1947, including more than 23 years as chief justice.

Green was born in Lebanon, Tennessee, the son of Nathan Green Jr., who taught law for 63 years at Cumberland School of Law of Cumberland University and served as the law school's chancellor. His paternal grandfather, Nathan Green Sr., had been a judge on the Tennessee Supreme Court for 20 years.

Green earned an LL.B from Cumberland School of Law in 1893, being called to the bar that same year.  He operated a law practice in Nashville until 1910, when he was elected as an associate justice of the Tennessee Supreme Court.  He was subsequently re-elected in 1918, 1926, 1934, and 1942. Green became the chief justice of Tennessee in 1923, serving until his death.  As of 2011, he holds the record as the person who served the longest on Tennessee's highest court.

In 1927, Green presided over the appeal of John T. Scopes, who had been convicted of teaching evolution.  The court found the law against teaching of evolution to be constitutional, but overturned Scopes' conviction on a technicality.  Five years later, Green also presided over Evans v. McCabe, 52 S.W. 2d 159 (1932) which held that the state constitution prohibits personal income taxes on wages, but not on interest-bearing investments.

A bust of Green is displayed in the Tennessee Supreme Court Building in Nashville.

References

1872 births
1947 deaths
People from Lebanon, Tennessee
Chief Justices of the Tennessee Supreme Court
Tennessee lawyers
Cumberland School of Law alumni